The 2018 Inter-Provincial Cup was the sixth edition of the Inter-Provincial Cup, a List A cricket competition played in Ireland. It was held from 28 May to 9 September 2018. It is the second edition of the competition to be played with List A status. Leinster Lightning were the defending champions.

In the second match of the tournament, between Leinster Lightning and Northern Knights, Simi Singh and George Dockrell of Leinster Lightning set a new record partnership in List A cricket for the seventh wicket, with 215 runs.

Leinster Lightning retained their title, after beating North West Warriors by 58 runs in the final match of the tournament.

Points table
The following teams competed:

Fixtures
As with the first-class competition, the Inter-Provincial Championship, the competition format is a home and away round robin.

1st match

2nd match

3rd match

4th match

5th match

6th match

References

External links
 Series home at ESPN Cricinfo

Inter
Inter-Provincial Cup seasons